The first season of The Mentalist premiered on September 23, 2008 and concluded on May 19, 2009. It consisted of 23 episodes.

Cast and characters

Main cast 
 Simon Baker as Patrick Jane
 Robin Tunney as Teresa Lisbon
 Tim Kang as Kimball Cho
 Owain Yeoman as Wayne Rigsby
 Amanda Righetti as Grace Van Pelt

Recurring cast 
 Gregory Itzin as Virgil Minelli (7 episodes)
 JoNell Kennedy as Marcia Wallace (2 episodes)

Notable guest cast 
 Xander Berkeley as Sheriff Thomas McAllister ("Red Hair and Silver Tape")
 Jack Plotnick as Brett Partridge ("Pilot")
 Leslie Hope as Kristina Frye ("Seeing Red")
 Alicia Witt as Rosalind Harker ("Red John's Footsteps")

Episodes

International reception 
In the UK, the first season aired on FIVE, on Thursdays at 9pm.  The series premiered on March 26, 2009 and concluded on August 20, 2009, with a double-bill.  Over the 23 episodes, the season averaged 2.84 million viewers, with the pilot being the most watched episode (4.21 million viewers), and "Red Brick and Ivy" being the least watched episode with 2.08 million viewers.

DVD release
All 23 episodes of the season were included on the six disc complete first season set. It was released on September 22, 2009 in Region 1, March 8, 2010 in Region 2, and September 23, 2009 in Region 4. Special features included the featurettes "Evidence of a Hit Series" and "Cracking the Crystal Ball: Mentalist Vs. Psychic". "Cracking the Crystal Ball: Mentalist Vs. Psychic", was produced by Martin Fisher at DG Entertainment for CBS Television. This short film explored the use of psychics in law enforcement by interviewing former FBI, parapsychologist Dr. Barry E. Taff, and psychic detective Jack Rourke. Other cast members include Mark Llewellyn, Karl Sonnenberg, Jon Armstrong.

References

External links 
 

2008 American television seasons
2009 American television seasons
The Mentalist seasons